Bickenbach may refer to:

Bickenbach, Hesse, a municipality in Hesse, Germany
Bickenbach, Rhineland-Palatinate, a municipality Rhineland-Palatinate, Germany 
Bickenbach, a part of Engelskirchen in North Rhine-Westphalia, Germany
Otto Bickenbach, (1901-1971), German internist and war criminal